Jon Burton is a British video game director, designer, writer, and programmer. He is the founder of development studio Traveller's Tales and its parent company TT Games.

Burton founded Traveller's Tales in 1989. He worked as a designer on Puggsy, Mickey Mania, Sonic 3D Blast and the Lego Star Wars series, and has served as programmer for many of their early games. He has received five British Academy of Film and Television Arts awards.

Career
Burton founded Traveller's Tales in late 1989 and served as creative director of the games. His first game as designer, Leander, was in 1991; next was Puggsy in 1993. The game enabled Traveller's Tales to expand the company and develop games with bigger companies. In 1994, Traveller's Tales developed Mickey Mania for Disney, initiating a long relationship with the company; Disney later hired them to develop tie-in games for many of its properties. Starting in 1995, Sega contracted the company to develop two Sonic the Hedgehog games, Sonic 3D Blast and Sonic R. He also served as creative director and lead designer of Crash Bandicoot: The Wrath of Cortex. Next, he was served as creative director, lead designer, and writer of the action-adventure video game Haven: Call of the King, which sequels to the game was planned to be a trilogy, but it was cancelled due to the game's commercial failure.

Burton announced in 2005 that Traveller's Tales would merge with Giant Interactive Entertainment to form parent company TT Games. He served as creative director of the Lego Star Wars series based on the toy line of the same name and the film franchise. In 2007, Burton and Warner Bros. Interactive Entertainment announced that they had purchased TT Games and Traveller's Tales for an undisclosed amount as part of their expansion into the video game industry. Burton served as creative director for both Lego Batman: The Videogame and its sequel, Lego Batman 2: DC Super Heroes. In 2013, Burton wrote the original story for, produced, and directed Lego Batman: The Movie – DC Super Heroes Unite based on the Lego Batman 2: DC Super Heroes video game. He also wrote the story for Lego Batman 3: Beyond Gotham alongside David A. Goodman, which was released in November 2014. Also in 2014, Burton worked as an executive producer for the Warner Bros. 2014 film The Lego Movie. He was a producer of the 2015 war thriller film Man Down, starring Shia LaBeouf, Kate Mara, and Gary Oldman. His latest game, Lego Dimensions, was released on 27 September 2015; Burton served as creative director, lead designer, and co-writer on this game.

In 2017, Burton began uploading videos demonstrating programming tricks and early prototypes of games that he worked on to his YouTube channel, GameHut, and has since created a new channel called Coding Secrets for the same content, in 2020. In October 2017, Burton announced that he would be creating an unofficial director's cut of the Sega Genesis version of Sonic 3D Blast, which was released in December 2017.

In August 2021 Jon founded new studio 10:10 Games.

Personal life
He currently lives in Malibu, California. Burton is a practicing Christian and included an Ichthys as an Easter egg in one of the tracks in Sonic R.

Works

Video games

Films

References

External links 
 MobyGames profile
 
 YouTube channel

Living people
Video game businesspeople
British Christians
Alumni of Liverpool John Moores University
British video game designers
Video game directors
British video game programmers
Businesspeople from Winchester
Year of birth missing (living people)